is a Japanese PlayStation 2 game made in 2005 by Genki Co. as a follow-up to Fu-un Shinsengumi.

As in the previous game, the player takes the role of a member of the Shinsengumi militia force.

Voice actors 
Daisuke Ono as Sakamoto Ryōma
Yui Sakakibara as Ikumatsu

Development
Artists such as Yoji Shinkawa worked on the software.

References

External links 
Official site of the PSP version 

2005 video games
Video games developed in Japan
Video games about police officers
Video games about samurai
Japan-exclusive video games
PlayStation Portable games
PlayStation 2 games